Lotta Udnes Weng (born 29 September 1996) is a Norwegian cross-country skier.

Career
At the 2014, 2015 and 2016 Junior World Championships she won four silver medals (one in relay), one bronze and one gold medal (both in relay). As an U23 junior she competed at the 2017 and 2018 Junior World Championships, bagging a gold medal from the 2017 skiathlon.

She made her World Cup debut in March 2015 in Drammen, and collected her first World Cup points in December 2016 in Lillehammer with a 22nd place in the 5 kilometres race. She broke the top 20 for the first time in the 2016–2017 Tour de Ski Oberstdorf skiathlon, and in December–January 2018–19 she broke the top 10 four times. She also made her World Championships debut in 2019, finishing 32nd in the sprint.

Weng represents the sports club Nes Ski. She is the twin sister of Tiril Udnes Weng and a third cousin of Heidi Weng.

Cross-country skiing results
All results are sourced from the International Ski Federation (FIS).

Olympic Games

World Championships

World Cup

Season standings

Individual podiums
 1 victory – (1 ) 
 3 podiums – (1 , 2 )

Team podiums
 1 victory – (1 ) 
 2 podiums – (1 ,1 )

References

External links
 
 
 
 

1996 births
Living people
People from Nes, Akershus
Norwegian female cross-country skiers
Twin sportspeople
Norwegian twins
Cross-country skiers at the 2022 Winter Olympics
Olympic cross-country skiers of Norway
Sportspeople from Viken (county)